Daryll Hill (born July 31, 1982) is an American former basketball player from Queens, New York.

He played at Cardozo High School in Bayside, Queens. He went on to play basketball at St. John's University in Jamaica, Queens. At St. John's he led the Big East Conference in scoring for one season. He's known as "Showtime Hill" due to his flashy moves while also playing at the Rucker Park streetball tournament.

He had a tryout with the New York Knicks, but has never played in the NBA. He played with the Albany Patroons during the 2008–2009 CBA season. He played 10 games with the Patroons averaging 2.5 assists per game and 5.9 points per game.

References

External links 
 Daryll Hill Albany Patroons Player Profile
 usbasket.net profile
 Daryll Hill ESPN Player Profile
 Daryll Hill St. Johns Player Profile

1982 births
Living people
African-American basketball players
Albany Patroons players
American expatriate basketball people in Canada
American expatriate basketball people in North Macedonia
KK MZT Skopje players
People from Bayside, Queens
Point guards
Sportspeople from Queens, New York
Basketball players from New York City
St. John's Red Storm men's basketball players
American men's basketball players
Benjamin N. Cardozo High School alumni
21st-century African-American sportspeople
20th-century African-American people